National statistics differ between five Metropolitan areas in Belgium. These five metropolitan areas (Dutch: Agglomeratie, French: Agglomération) are also covered by Eurostat statistics as separate Larger Urban Zones (LUZ).

Metropolitan areas

See also 
 List of cities and towns in Belgium
 List of metropolitan areas in European Union

References

External links 
 Directorate-general Statistics Belgium, FPS Economy Belgium

 
Belgium
Belgium geography-related lists